The consorts of Aquitaine were the spouses of the Aquitanian monarchs. They were mostly Duchess but other held the titles Lady or Queen.

Early Frankish Duchesses 

 Chalde of Orléans, daughter of Duke/Count Wilichaire, wife of Chram, killed by Chlothar, King of the Franks
 Tetradia, daughter of a noblewoman and a peasant, wife of Desiderius, 
 Unnamed wife Eudes, mother of Hunald I
 Unnamed wife Hunald I, mother of Waifer

Frankish queen of Aquitaine

Merovingian dynasty, 629–632

Carolingian dynasty, 778–877

Duchess of Aquitaine

Ramnulfid House of Poitiers (1st time), 852–893

House of Auvergne, 893–927

Ramnulfid House of Poitiers (2nd time), 927–932

House of Rouergue, 932–955

Ramnulfid House of Poitiers (3rd time), 962–1189

House of Plantagenet, 1189–1449

English Occupation 
The Ducal title of Aquitaine was merged with the English claimed Crown of France, 1337–1360; so Philippa of Hainault, the Queen of Edward III was also the Duchess of Aquitaine

Lady of Aquitaine, 1360–1369

Princess of Aquitaine (royal title), 1362–1372 

The Ducal title of Aquitaine was merged again with the English claimed Crown of France, 1369–1390; so Anne of Bohemia, first queen of Richard II was also the Duchess of Aquitaine.

Duchess of Aquitaine (under England), 1390–1422 

The Ducal title of Aquitaine was merged again with the English claimed Crown of France, 1413–1449; so the English queens: Joanna of Navarre, Catherine of Valois and Margaret of Anjou were also Duchesses of Aquitaine.  After the loss of most of Aquitaine to the Valois, the French kings gain completed rights to title that they had taken back from Edward III in 1337.

The Duchy of Aquitaine was reclaimed by the Crown of France in 1337; but it wasn't until 1449 that the Valois kings were able to conquer it from the Plantaganets. The Kings of France granted the title of Duke of Guyenne to their heirs, the Dauphins.  The title was used after the fall of the French monarchy by the member of the Bourbon family.

Duchess of Guyenne

House of Valois and Bourbon, since 1337

Sources 
AQUITAINE

Aquitaine
Aquitaine
Aquitaine
 
 
Aquitaine, List of royal consorts of